Place Vertu is a shopping mall in the borough of Saint-Laurent in Montreal, Quebec, Canada. It is located on Côte-Vertu Boulevard, at the corner of Cavendish Boulevard.

Stores
Anchors are Canadian Tire, Marché Adonis, Sports Experts/Atmosphere, Dollarama, and Uniprix. There is also a food court. The mall has many outlets.

History
Place Vertu's anchors on its debut on August 28, 1975 were The Bay, Kmart and Dominion for a total of 110 stores. Although Sears was also among the original tenants that signed with Place Vertu, it opened its doors two months after the other stores on October 29. The mall was expanded in the 1980s when a corridor was added, going from the center court to a new Pascal's hardware store. Another corridor with an office tower was added in the mid-1980s from The Bay to Pascal's.

Dominion was converted into a Provigo on July 13, 1981, Pascal's former space occupied by Zellers in 1991, Provigo was converted once more into a Maxi in 1994 and Kmart's former store space was occupied by Canadian Tire in 2000. Maxi closed in 2001. The Bay closed in May 2007; Zellers relocated to The Bay's vacated location in the same year.

Since 2008, the mall has been renovated and now include tenants such as Urban Planet, Dollarama, Laura/Laura+/Laura Petite Outlet, Browns Outlet, Starbucks Coffee (taking Subway's old space after that location moved to the food court). Marché Adonis took the space of Maxi in 2009. Additionally, the mall space between Zellers and the food court was turned into a Winners (which had moved from the strip mall across the street) and the existing tenants from this section were relocated elsewhere in the mall. Zellers old space (formerly Pascal's) remained empty, but was replaced by Gold's Gym in 2012.

After more than 20 years in the mall, Zellers closed in December 2012 and was succeeded the following year by Target, but it was closed in 2015, and Sports Experts/Atmosphere relocated to that space in November 10, 2016, using only 53,000 square feet of the emplacement.

Sears closed in October 2017.

Ownership
Place Vertu was originally the property of Cambridge Leaseholds with co-ownership by both Simpsons-Sears and the Hudson's Bay Company. It was one of Cambridge's only shopping malls in the province of Quebec.

In 2001, Cambridge merged with Ivanhoe to become Ivanhoe Cambridge; Place Vertu became the property of this combined company. Ten years later, in 2011, Ivanhoe Cambridge sold the mall to Primaris.

Place Vertu is now managed by the Westcliff Group.

See also
 List of largest shopping malls in Canada
 List of malls in Montreal
 List of shopping malls in Canada

References

External links

 

Shopping malls established in 1975
Shopping malls in Montreal
Saint-Laurent, Quebec
1975 establishments in Quebec